1965 college football season may refer to:

 1965 NCAA University Division football season
 1965 NCAA College Division football season
 1965 NAIA football season